Chloris is a widespread genus of monophyletic grasses belonging to the family Poaceae, known generally as windmill grass or finger grass.
The genus is found worldwide, but especially in the tropical and subtropical regions, and more often in the Southern Hemisphere. The species are variable in morphology, but in general, the plants are less than 0.5 m in height. They bear inflorescences shaped like umbels, with several plumes lined with rows of spikelets. The genus is characterized by the series of sterile florets above the lowest fertile ones, spikes usually 4–10 in numbers (occasionally 1–2), approximated or in a slightly separated series of 10–20 spikes, rarely an indefinite numbers of terminal spikes (then usually up to 50 or rarely more, as seen in Chloris roxburghiana Schultes). In India, 11 species are known to occur in which only two are endemic viz. Chloris wightiana Nees ex Steud. and Chloris bournei Rangachariar & Tadulingam. 

The genus was named for Chloris of Greek myth, a figure associated with flowers and spring.

 Species

 formerly included
species now considered better suited to other genera: Aegopogon Austrochloris Bouteloua Chondrosum Chrysochloa Ctenium Cynodon Dactyloctenium Daknopholis Disakisperma Eleusine Enteropogon Eustachys Gymnopogon Harpochloa Leptochloa Oxychloris Pseudopogonatherum Schoenefeldia Tetrapogon Trichloris

References

External links
 Jepson Manual Treatment
 USDA Plants Profile
 Grass Manual Treatment

 
Poaceae genera
Grasses of North America
Taxa named by Olof Swartz